Promalactis is a genus of moths of the family Oecophoridae.

Taxonomic history
The genus was established by Edward Meyrick in 1908. It currently comprises 179 valid species worldwide, distributed mainly in the Palaearctic and Oriental regions. China has the greatest diversity, with 101 recorded species.

Identification
Promalactis is represented by the combination of the following characters: the smooth head with metallic lustre, the lanceolate forewings with various dark or white markings against yellow to deep ochreous-brown ground colour; the variously shaped symmetrical or asymmetrical valvae and a narrow to very broad sacculus in the male genitalia; and a developed to ill-defined lamella postvaginalis and an elongate thin ductus bursae in the female genitalia.

Biology
Little is known about the biology of this genus. Meyrick reported that larvae fed on rotten wood or bark of Pinaceae and other trees.

Species

References

 ,  & , 2011: Taxonomic study of the genus Promalactis Meyrick (Lepidoptera: Oecophoridae) from Hainan Province, China. Zootaxa, 3044: 49–64. Preview.
 , 2012: One new species and two newly recorded species in the genus Promalactis Meyrick (Lepidoptera: Oecophoridae) from China. Entomotaxonomia 34 (2): 247-252.
 , 2009: Four new species of the genus Promalactis Meyrick, 1908 from China (Lepidoptera: Oecophoridae). SHILAP Revista de Lepidopterología 37 (147): 319-325.
 , 2011: Two new species and two newly recorded species of the genus Promalactis Meyrick (Lepidoptera: Oecophoridae) from China. Acta Zootaxonomica Sinica 36 (3): 581-585. Abstract and full article: 
 , 2002: The genus Promalactis (Oecophoridae) from Japan. Japan Heterocerists' Journal 218: 337-350.
 , 2012: Genus Promalactis Meyrick (Lepidoptera: Oecophoridae) in northern Vietnam. Part II: six new species of the genus. Journal of Natural History 46 (15-16): 897-909. Abstract: .
 , 2010: Genus Promalactis (Lepidoptera: Oecophoridae) from North Vietnam, Part 1: description of five new species. Florida Entomologist 93 (4): 546-557. Full article: .
 , 1985: New species of the broad winged moths (Lepidoptera: Oecophoridae) from Primorye Region. Trudy Zoologicheskogo Instituta Leningrad 134: 95-101.
 , 1986: A review of the broad-winged moths (Lepidoptera: Oecophoridae) of the Far East. Trudy Zoologicheskogo Instituta Leningrad 145: 72-74.
 , 1988: New and little known species of broad-winged moths (Lepidoptera: Oecophoridae) from Vietnam. Trudy Zoologicheskogo Instituta Akademii Nauk SSSR 176: 120-128.
 , 1997: New and little-known species of oecophorid moths (Lepidoptera: Oecophoridae) from Vietnam. Zoologicheskii Zhurnal 76 (6): 759-762.
 , 2000: New and little known species of oecophorid moths of the genera Epicalima Dyar, 1903 and Promalactis Meyrick, 1908 (Lepidoptera: Oecophoridae) from South East Asia. Entomologicheskoe Obozrenie 79 (3): 664-691. (= Entomological Review 2000 80 (5): 544-568).
 , 2000: A new subspecies of Promalactis autoclina Meyrick, 1935 from Indonesia (Lepidoptera: Oecophoridae). Atalanta 31 (1/2): 245-247.
 , 2007: New species of the moth genus Promalactis Meyrick, 1908 from Indonesia and Vietnam (Lepidoptera: Oecophoridae). Zoosystematica Rossica 16 (1): 127-130.
 , 2010: A new species of the genus Promalactis Meyrick, 1908 from China (Lepidoptera: Oecophoridae). Atalanta 41 (1/2): 271-272.
 , 1998: Genus Promalactis Meyrick (Lepidoptera: Oecophoridae) from Korea, with descriptions of six new species. Journal of Asia-Pacific Entomology 1 (1): 51-70. 
 ; ;  2009: Microlepidoptera of Hong Kong: Oecophoridae I: the genus Promalactis Meyrick. Zootaxa, 2239: 31-44. Abstract & excerpt
  1998: Acta Zootaxonomica Sinica, 23 (4). .
 , 2006: Oecophoridae of China (Insecta: Lepidoptera). 1-258. Science Press, Beijing.
 ;  2004: A study on the genus Promalactis from China: descriptions of 15 new species (Lepidoptera: Oecophoridae). Oriental Insects, 38: 1-25.
 , 2000: A study on the genus Promalactis Meyrick (Lepidoptera: Oecophoridae) from China: five new species and two new record species. Entomologia Sinica 7 (4): 289-298.
 , 2001: One new species and one new record of the genus Promalactis Meyrick from China (Lepidoptera: Oecophoridae). Acta Entomologica Sinica 44 (1): 92-94. Abstract: .
 , 2007: A new species and a newly reported female of the genus Promalactis Meyrick (Lepidoptera: Oecophoridae) from China. Entomotaxonomia 29 (4): 287-298. Abstract: 
 , 1998: five new species and one new record of the genus Promalactis Meyrick from China. Acta Zootaxonomica Sinica 10 (23): 399-405. Full article 

Oecophorinae